Jamal Akua Lowe (born 21 July 1994) is a professional footballer who plays as a forward and winger for EFL Championship club Queens Park Rangers, on loan from Premier League club AFC Bournemouth, and the Jamaica national team. He was born in England and played for the England C team, before making his full international debut for Jamaica in 2021.

Lowe began his professional playing career with Barnet in 2012. After several loan spells, he briefly played for St Albans City and Hemel Hempstead Town. Lowe joined Hampton & Richmond Borough in 2015 before moving to Portsmouth two years later, spending two seasons with the club. He was signed by Wigan Athletic in 2019 and joined  Swansea City in 2020. In 2021 he was signed by  AFC Bournemouth, and since then he has gone out on loan to  Queens Park Rangers.

Club career

Barnet
Lowe first featured for the Bees' senior team in February 2011 in the Herts Senior Cup against Hadley. In the 2011–12 season, Lowe scored 19 goals for Barnet's under-18 team. He made his league debut on 25 August 2012, in a 3–1 loss against York City at Underhill, coming on as a late substitute for Curtis Weston. After making a second substitute appearance against Gillingham, he was given his first start by manager Mark Robson on 15 September in a 3–0 loss against Bradford City.

Lowe signed a professional contract with the Bees in October 2012. He made his FA Cup debut on 3 November, coming on as a substitute in the second half of a 2–0 defeat against Oxford United in the first round. In December 2012, he was loaned out to Hayes & Yeading United. He joined Boreham Wood on 15 February 2013.

On 15 August 2013, Lowe joined Hitchin Town on loan. His fourth loan spell away from the club began when he joined St Albans City on 22 November. Then, his fifth loan spell came when he joined Farnborough on 28 February 2014. Lowe was transfer-listed at the end of the 2013–14 season. Manager Martin Allen said: "He is a good lad who has worked hard and done well in both the games he has played but I need to bring in another striker and this will push Jamal further down the line".

In 2014–15, Lowe made two substitute appearances for the Bees before joining Hemel Hempstead Town on a three-month loan. On 16 January 2015, he left Barnet permanently to join St Albans City. At the end of the season he rejoined Hemel Hempstead Town. After 11 league games he then joined Hampton & Richmond Borough.

Portsmouth
On 28 October 2016, Portsmouth agreed terms to sign Lowe for an undisclosed fee on an 18-month contract.
Jamal Lowe helped Portsmouth to win the 16/17 League 2 title, scoring a goal in the final match that saw them champions of the league and automatic promotion to league one where he stayed and became a permanent player in the squad.He was also in the squad that won the check a trade trophy in 2019. 
In January 2018 Lowe signed a new contract keeping him at Fratton Park until 2021.

Wigan Athletic
On 1 August 2019, Lowe signed a three-year contract with Wigan Athletic for an undisclosed fee. He scored his first goal for the club on 20 October 2019 against Nottingham Forest.

Swansea City 
On 27 August 2020, Lowe joined Championship club Swansea City for £800,000, signing a three-year contract with an option of a further year. He scored his first goal for Swansea in a 2–0 win over Wycombe Wanderers on 26 September 2020.

AFC Bournemouth 
On 31 August 2021, Lowe signed a three-year contract with Swansea's Championship rivals AFC Bournemouth, joining for a reported fee of £1.5 million.

Queens Park Rangers
On 11 January 2023, Lowe joined EFL Championship promotion hopefuls Queens Park Rangers on a six-month loan deal.

International career
Despite being born in England and having previously played for the England C team, in March 2021 Lowe received his first call-up to the Jamaica national team. This came about as part of the Jamaican Football Federation's attempt to target a number of English-born players for call ups in an attempt to improve the chances of Jamaica qualifying for the 2022 World Cup. On 25 March 2021, Lowe scored his first goal on his debut in a 4–1 loss to United States.

Personal life
Born in England, Lowe is of Jamaican descent. Lowe worked as a PE teacher while playing in non-league football. He is friends with Nicke Kabamba and Junior Morias.

Career statistics

Club

International

Scores and results list Jamaica's goal tally first, score column indicates score after each Lowe goal.

Honours
AFC Bournemouth
Championship runner-up: 2021–22

Hampton & Richmond Borough
Isthmian Premier League: 2015–16

Portsmouth
EFL League Two: 2016–17
EFL Trophy: 2018–19

Individual
PFA Team of the Year: 2018–19 League One

References

External links

1994 births
Living people
Association football wingers
Jamaican footballers
Jamaica international footballers
English footballers
England semi-pro international footballers
English people of Jamaican descent
Barnet F.C. players
Hayes & Yeading United F.C. players
Boreham Wood F.C. players
Hitchin Town F.C. players
St Albans City F.C. players
Farnborough F.C. players
Hemel Hempstead Town F.C. players
Hampton & Richmond Borough F.C. players
Portsmouth F.C. players
Wigan Athletic F.C. players
Swansea City A.F.C. players
AFC Bournemouth players
Queens Park Rangers F.C. players
Premier League players
English Football League players
National League (English football) players
Southern Football League players
Isthmian League players
Footballers from the London Borough of Harrow
Black British sportspeople